The 1948–49 New York Rangers season was the franchise's 23rd season. During the regular season, the Rangers compiled an 18–31–11 record, and finished with 47 points. The Rangers' last-place finish caused them to miss the NHL playoffs.

Regular season

Final standings

Record vs. opponents

Schedule and results

|- align="center" bgcolor="white"
| 1 || 14 || @ Montreal Canadiens || 1–1 || 0–0–1
|- align="center" bgcolor="#FFBBBB"
| 2 || 17 || @ Detroit Red Wings || 7–0 || 0–1–1
|- align="center" bgcolor="#FFBBBB"
| 3 || 24 || @ Boston Bruins || 4–1 || 0–2–1
|- align="center" bgcolor="#FFBBBB"
| 4 || 27 || Detroit Red Wings || 3–2 || 0–3–1
|- align="center" bgcolor="#CCFFCC"
| 5 || 31 || Boston Bruins || 2–0 || 1–3–1
|-

|- align="center" bgcolor="white"
| 6 || 6 || @ Toronto Maple Leafs || 3–3 || 1–3–2
|- align="center" bgcolor="#FFBBBB"
| 7 || 7 || @ Chicago Black Hawks || 4–2 || 1–4–2
|- align="center" bgcolor="#CCFFCC"
| 8 || 10 || Chicago Black Hawks || 4–3 || 2–4–2
|- align="center" bgcolor="#FFBBBB"
| 9 || 13 || Montreal Canadiens || 3–1 || 2–5–2
|- align="center" bgcolor="white"
| 10 || 14 || Toronto Maple Leafs || 4–4 || 2–5–3
|- align="center" bgcolor="white"
| 11 || 17 || @ Detroit Red Wings || 4–4 || 2–5–4
|- align="center" bgcolor="#CCFFCC"
| 12 || 21 || @ Boston Bruins || 4–1 || 3–5–4
|- align="center" bgcolor="#FFBBBB"
| 13 || 25 || @ Chicago Black Hawks || 6–4 || 3–6–4
|- align="center" bgcolor="#FFBBBB"
| 14 || 27 || @ Toronto Maple Leafs || 3–0 || 3–7–4
|- align="center" bgcolor="#FFBBBB"
| 15 || 30 || Chicago Black Hawks || 4–2 || 3–8–4
|-

|- align="center" bgcolor="#FFBBBB"
| 16 || 4 || @ Montreal Canadiens || 3–1 || 3–9–4
|- align="center" bgcolor="#FFBBBB"
| 17 || 5 || Detroit Red Wings || 3–1 || 3–10–4
|- align="center" bgcolor="white"
| 18 || 7 || Boston Bruins || 2–2 || 3–10–5
|- align="center" bgcolor="#FFBBBB"
| 19 || 11 || @ Detroit Red Wings || 5–3 || 3–11–5
|- align="center" bgcolor="#CCFFCC"
| 20 || 12 || Detroit Red Wings || 2–0 || 4–11–5
|- align="center" bgcolor="#CCFFCC"
| 21 || 15 || Toronto Maple Leafs || 3–1 || 5–11–5
|- align="center" bgcolor="white"
| 22 || 18 || @ Toronto Maple Leafs || 3–3 || 5–11–6
|- align="center" bgcolor="#CCFFCC"
| 23 || 19 || Montreal Canadiens || 3–2 || 6–11–6
|- align="center" bgcolor="#CCFFCC"
| 24 || 23 || @ Chicago Black Hawks || 3–2 || 7–11–6
|- align="center" bgcolor="#CCFFCC"
| 25 || 25 || @ Montreal Canadiens || 2–0 || 8–11–6
|- align="center" bgcolor="#FFBBBB"
| 26 || 26 || Chicago Black Hawks || 2–1 || 8–12–6
|- align="center" bgcolor="white"
| 27 || 31 || Boston Bruins || 2–2 || 8–12–7
|-

|- align="center" bgcolor="#FFBBBB"
| 28 || 1 || @ Boston Bruins || 4–1 || 8–13–7
|- align="center" bgcolor="#CCFFCC"
| 29 || 2 || Toronto Maple Leafs || 4–2 || 9–13–7
|- align="center" bgcolor="#CCFFCC"
| 30 || 5 || Chicago Black Hawks || 3–1 || 10–13–7
|- align="center" bgcolor="white"
| 31 || 9 || Montreal Canadiens || 1–1 || 10–13–8
|- align="center" bgcolor="#FFBBBB"
| 32 || 12 || Detroit Red Wings || 4–1 || 10–14–8
|- align="center" bgcolor="#FFBBBB"
| 33 || 15 || @ Toronto Maple Leafs || 2–1 || 10–15–8
|- align="center" bgcolor="#CCFFCC"
| 34 || 16 || Toronto Maple Leafs || 4–0 || 11–15–8
|- align="center" bgcolor="#FFBBBB"
| 35 || 19 || Boston Bruins || 5–2 || 11–16–8
|- align="center" bgcolor="#FFBBBB"
| 36 || 20 || @ Montreal Canadiens || 2–1 || 11–17–8
|- align="center" bgcolor="white"
| 37 || 23 || @ Chicago Black Hawks || 2–2 || 11–17–9
|- align="center" bgcolor="#CCFFCC"
| 38 || 26 || @ Detroit Red Wings || 5–1 || 12–17–9
|- align="center" bgcolor="#CCFFCC"
| 39 || 30 || Montreal Canadiens || 9–0 || 13–17–9
|-

|- align="center" bgcolor="#FFBBBB"
| 40 || 2 || @ Boston Bruins || 5–3 || 13–18–9
|- align="center" bgcolor="white"
| 41 || 5 || @ Toronto Maple Leafs || 1–1 || 13–18–10
|- align="center" bgcolor="#CCFFCC"
| 42 || 6 || @ Chicago Black Hawks || 2–0 || 14–18–10
|- align="center" bgcolor="#FFBBBB"
| 43 || 9 || @ Detroit Red Wings || 8–0 || 14–19–10
|- align="center" bgcolor="#FFBBBB"
| 44 || 10 || Chicago Black Hawks || 3–1 || 14–20–10
|- align="center" bgcolor="#FFBBBB"
| 45 || 12 || @ Boston Bruins || 4–2 || 14–21–10
|- align="center" bgcolor="#FFBBBB"
| 46 || 13 || Toronto Maple Leafs || 3–0 || 14–22–10
|- align="center" bgcolor="#CCFFCC"
| 47 || 16 || Detroit Red Wings || 4–0 || 15–22–10
|- align="center" bgcolor="#FFBBBB"
| 48 || 19 || @ Montreal Canadiens || 3–1 || 15–23–10
|- align="center" bgcolor="#CCFFCC"
| 49 || 20 || Montreal Canadiens || 3–2 || 16–23–10
|- align="center" bgcolor="#FFBBBB"
| 50 || 23 || Boston Bruins || 3–2 || 16–24–10
|- align="center" bgcolor="#CCFFCC"
| 51 || 27 || Detroit Red Wings || 3–2 || 17–24–10
|-

|- align="center" bgcolor="#FFBBBB"
| 52 || 2 || @ Chicago Black Hawks || 5–2 || 17–25–10
|- align="center" bgcolor="#FFBBBB"
| 53 || 5 || @ Toronto Maple Leafs || 7–1 || 17–26–10
|- align="center" bgcolor="#FFBBBB"
| 54 || 6 || Toronto Maple Leafs || 4–3 || 17–27–10
|- align="center" bgcolor="#FFBBBB"
| 55 || 9 || @ Boston Bruins || 8–1 || 17–28–10
|- align="center" bgcolor="#FFBBBB"
| 56 || 12 || @ Montreal Canadiens || 3–0 || 17–29–10
|- align="center" bgcolor="white"
| 57 || 13 || Montreal Canadiens || 1–1 || 17–29–11
|- align="center" bgcolor="#FFBBBB"
| 58 || 15 || Boston Bruins || 4–2 || 17–30–11
|- align="center" bgcolor="#FFBBBB"
| 59 || 16 || @ Detroit Red Wings || 6–2 || 17–31–11
|- align="center" bgcolor="#CCFFCC"
| 60 || 20 || Chicago Black Hawks || 5–1 || 18–31–11
|-

Playoffs
The Rangers finished in last place in the NHL and failed to qualify for the 1949 Stanley Cup playoffs.

Player statistics
Skaters

Goaltenders

†Denotes player spent time with another team before joining Rangers. Stats reflect time with Rangers only.
‡Traded mid-season. Stats reflect time with Rangers only.

Awards and records

Transactions

See also
1948–49 NHL season

References

New York Rangers seasons
New York Rangers
New York Rangers
New York Rangers
New York Rangers
Madison Square Garden
1940s in Manhattan